Persida Nenadović (15 February 1813 – 29 March 1873) was the Princess consort of Serbia as the wife of Alexander Karađorđević, who ruled the Principality of Serbia from his election on 14 September 1842 until his abdication on 24 October 1858. She was the mother of ten children, including future king Peter I of Serbia, who succeeded to the throne after the assassination of King Alexander I, the last ruler of the Obrenović dynasty (the traditional rivals of the Karađorđevićs).

Life
Persida was born on 15 February 1813 in Brankovina, Ottoman Empire (now Serbia), the daughter of voivode (commander) Jevrem Nenadović (1793–1867) and Jovanka Milovanović (1792–1880). Her paternal grandfather was Jakov Nenadović, the first Serbian Interior Minister of Revolutionary Serbia, maternal grandfather Mladen Milovanović was the first Minister of Defence.

On 1 June 1830 in Hotin, Bessarabia, at the age of 17, she married Alexander Karađorđević, the son of Karađorđe Petrović and Jelena Jovanović. On 14 September 1842, Alexander was elected as Prince of Serbia, succeeding the deposed Prince Miloš Obrenović, and himself becoming the first Karađorđević ruler. From that date until his own abdication, Persida was styled Princess of Serbia.

In 1858, Prince Alexander came into conflict with members of the Council, with the result that he was compelled to abdicate in favour of Miloš Obrenović, who returned to power for the second time. Following Alexander's abdication, she and her family retired to Timișoara. She gave birth to a total of 10 children, six of whom lived to adulthood.

She died on 29 March 1873 at the age of 60 in Vienna. In 1912, their son King Peter ordered the remains of Princess Persida and Prince Alexander to be moved to the Church of St. George in Oplenac.

The actress Catherine Oxenberg is one of Persida's many descendants.

For her charitable work and cultural activities, Sultan Abdul Majid awarded her the Order of the Padishah Portrait in 1864. She also organized frequent art promotion gatherings that were quite significant for the life of the Serbian capital.

Issue
The children of Alexander and Persida:
 Princess Poleksija (1 February 1833 – 5 December 1914), married firstly in 1849 Konstantin Nikolajević (1821 – murdered 13 October 1877), Serbian Minister of the Interior, by whom she had issue ; secondly Dr Alexander Preshern (1830 – 2 December 1914).
 Princess Kleopatra (26 November 1835 – 13 July 1855), married in 1855 Milan Avram Petronijević, Serbian Ambassador to Russia.
 Prince Aleksij (23 March 1836 – 21 April 1841)
 Prince Svetozar (1841 – 17 March 1847)
 Prince Peter (29 June 1844 – 16 August 1921), ruled Serbia from 1903 until 1918, and subsequently as King of the Kingdom of Serbs, Croats, and Slovenes until his death ; married Princess Zorka of Montenegro, by whom he had issue.
 Princess Jelena (18 October 1846 – 26 July 1867), married in 1867 Đorđe Simić (28 February 1843 – 11 October 1921), Prime Minister of Serbia.
 Prince Andrej (15 September 1848 – 12 July 1864)
 Princess Jelisaveta (born and died 1850)
 Prince Đorđe (11 October 1856 – 5 January 1889)
 Prince Arsenije (16 April 1859 – 1938), married in 1892, a Russian noblewoman, Princess and Countess Aurora Pavlovna Demidova. They were the parents of Prince Paul of Yugoslavia.

See also
 List of Serbian consorts

References

1813 births
1873 deaths
19th-century Serbian people
Serbian royal consorts
People from Valjevo
Persida
Burials at the Mausoleum of the Royal House of Karađorđević, Oplenac
19th-century Serbian women